Afrocarpus usambarensis is a species of conifer in the family Podocarpaceae. The tree is endemic to Tanzania, in Afromontane habitats.

References

Podocarpaceae
Endemic flora of Tanzania
Trees of Africa
Afromontane flora
Endangered flora of Africa
Taxonomy articles created by Polbot
Plants described in 1903